Obreja may refer to:

Places
Obreja, a commune in Caraş-Severin County, Romania
Obreja, a village in Mihalț Commune, Alba County, Romania
Obreja, a village in Stănești Commune, Gorj County, Romania
Obreja Veche, a commune in Făleşti district, Moldova

Persons
Grigore Obreja (1967–2016), Romanian sprint canoeist